The Daihatsu New-Line was a compact series of pickup trucks and vans built by Daihatsu from 1963 until 1968. They were based on the Daihatsu Hijet "keitora" and microvans, although they were somewhat larger and sturdier. The 797 cc inline-four engine also seen in the Daihatsu Compagno was fitted, rather than the 356 cc two-stroke unit seen in the Hijet.

First generation (L50)

Based on the first Hijet (of late 1960), the first New-Line used a conventional front-engine, rear-wheel-drive format with the driver sitting behind the engine, in a similar pickup fashion. It arrived in January 1963. This car did not meet the strict kei car standards of the time and sold only in small numbers, until its replacement in February 1966.

Second generation (S50)

The smaller Hijet adopted a cab-over approach in 1964, retaining availability of the first generation bonneted style. From February 1966 an 800 cc version of this Hijet was also available, as the "Daihatsu New-Line Cab" (S50, S50T). It replaced the earlier L50 New Line. As for its predecessor, it shared its engine with the Daihatsu Compagno. The New Line Cab was built until March 1968, and was replaced by the somewhat larger Daihatsu Delta 750.

References

Newline
Pickup trucks
Vans
Cab over vehicles
Vehicles introduced in 1963
Vehicles discontinued in 1968